Toll may refer to:

Transportation 
 Toll (fee) a fee charged for the use of a road or waterway
 Road pricing, the modern practice of charging for road use
 Road toll (historic), the historic practice of charging for road use
 Shadow toll, payments made by government to the private sector operator of a road based on the number of vehicles using the road
 Road toll (Australia and New Zealand), term for road death toll, i.e., the number of deaths caused annually by road accidents

Brands and enterprises 
 Toll Brothers, Horsham Township, Pennsylvania based construction company founded by brothers Robert I. Toll and Bruce E. Toll
 Toll Collect, a transportation support company in Germany
 Toll Group, an Australian transportation company
 Toll Domestic Forwarding, an Australian freight forwarder
 Toll Ipec, Australian transportation company
 Toll Resources & Government Logistics

Science
 Toll (gene), encode members of the Toll-like receptor class of proteins
 Toll-like receptor, a class of proteins that play a key role in the innate immune system

Technology
 Toll (telecommunications), refers to connection charges, for instance note Trunk vs. Toll charging and toll-free telephone numbers
 Toll switching trunk, in telephone communications systems

Other uses
 Toll, Queensland, a locality in the Charters Towers Region, Australia
Funeral toll, the slow, solemn ringing of church bells at funerals
 Toll (name),  a list of people with the name
 Toll, the ringing of a bell
 Tolling (law), a doctrine which allows for the pausing or delaying of the running of the period of time set forth by a statute of limitations

See also 

Tola (disambiguation)
For Whom the Bell Tolls (disambiguation)
Tol (disambiguation)
The Toll (disambiguation)
Toll Gate (disambiguation)
Toll house (disambiguation)
Troll (disambiguation)

ru:Толь (значения)